Dominant CZ is a hen hatchery company in the Czech Republic. The main store is in Studenec, but it has another 39 stores in Czech Republic, which are in Bílovec, Blatnice pod Svatým Antonínkem, Borek, Bratkovice, Bravantice, Březina, Býškovice, Častotice, Čepí, Černovice, Čížkrajice, Dolany, Dolní Cerekev (2 stores), Háj ve Slezsku, Hradišťany, Jezernice, Kobeřice, Kraselov, Kravaře, Lipník, Nymburk, Oldřichovice, Otročín, Palkovice, Prakšice, Prostějov, Řimovice, Skalice, Staré Prachatice, Stěžírky, Strážov, Trutnov, Uhlířov, Velká, Veltěže, Veselí nad Lužnicí, Volevčice and Vsetín. The company was founded in 1989. The purpose of the company is to hatch hybrid hens, which lay more than 250 eggs a year, which are imitating the non-hybrid species of hens, which do not die prematurely, which are not aggressive, which are well feathered and which are all the same size. The hybrids are always hatched from two non-hybridized hens. The hens start to lay eggs in the 20th–23rd week of their life. Excluding the Czech Republic, it works in 49 more countries in the world. Hens hatched by this company are favorite, because of their easy breeding and higher egg-laying and lifetime unlike other hens.

In 2020, during the coronavirus pandemic, Dominant CZ established 12 new species of hens, including seven special greenshell species and one special blackshell species.

Hen species 
The company completely offers 28 hen species.

Classic hens (D) 
The company offers 20 species of classic hens, with four new species established in 2020 (marked bold). Their name always has a code, which consists of name of the company (Dominant), name of the hen species and numeral code, which consists of D and number of the hen (for example D959).

Greenshell hens (GS) 
Greenshell hens are special hen hybrids established in 2020. They are typical for having significant crest and for laying green eggs. Instead of classic hens, they are all named "Greenshell" and are distinguished only by their numeral code. They were created by combinating Dominant hybrids and Araucana hens.

Darkshell hens (DS) 
Currently, there is only one species of darkshell hens, established in 2020, significant for having partially feathered legs and dark brown egg shell colour. They were created by combinating Dominant hybrids and Marans hens.

Other countries 
The company exports its hens out from the Czech Republic to 39 more countries. The hens are exported into Angola, Armenia, Austria, Azerbaijan, Bangladesh, Belgium, Belarus, Bulgaria, Canada, Ecuador, Equatorial Guinea, Estonia, Ethiopia, Germany, Ghana, Great Britain, Greece, Ireland, Israel, Italy, Kenya, Kuwait, Latvia, Lithuania, Mali, Mexico, Moldova, Myanmar, Nepal, Netherlands, Nigeria, Pakistan, Philippines, Poland, Romania, Russia, Saudi Arabia, Senegal, Slovakia, Slovenia, Spain, Suriname, Switzerland, Syria, Turkey, Ukraine, United Arab Emirates, Uganda and Vietnam.

References 

Agriculture companies of the Czech Republic
Companies established in 1989
1989 establishments in Czechoslovakia
Chickens